Daniel Garcia (born July 24, 1975) is an American music video and commercial director.

Garcia began his career designing labels for santería potions sold at local botánicas. Soon after, he landed at advertising agency DDB and, while working overtime, rounded up enough clients to go freelance.

Garcia practices computer animation and graphic design, and has directed videos for such bands as Mates of State, The Go! Team, and TV on the Radio, whose video for "Me-I" won the award for Best Music Video at the 2008 SXSW Festival. Previous videos also received recognition, including Madvillain's "Monkey Suite", which was nominated for an MTV Woodie in 2007, and J Dilla's "Nothing Like This", which played at the Animation Block Party and Pictoplasma, and was nominated for an award at the Ottawa International Animation Festival. In addition to videos, Garcia also directs commercials, including several spots for Nike, and dabbles in photography and print design.

Filmography

Music videos

Short films 
 "BoyCatBird in City Suckers" (2008)
 "The Most Dangerous Game" (2013)
 "Jumby" (2014)
 "El Cuco" (2016)
 "The Accidental Chrononaut" (2016)
 "Undefeated" (2017)
 "Emotions" (2017)
 "Wizard Skull" (2017)
 "El Cuco Is Hungry" (2018)

Awards and nominations

References

External links 
 
YouTube Channel

Advertising directors
American music video directors
Living people
1975 births
Place of birth missing (living people)